The Drug Years is a 2006 television documentary series produced by the Sundance Channel and VH1 about illicit drug use in the United States in the second half of the 20th century.

It is divided into four episodes, based on chronology:
"Break On Through" (1950s–1967) This is about the sudden appearance of recreational drugs being used by beatniks and jazz musicians. 
"Feed Your Head" (1967–1971) This shows the beginning and the demise of the hippie movement in America, especially in San Francisco. 
"Teenage Wasteland" (1970s) This chronicles the years after the hippie movement. The explosion of cocaine and disco are explored. 
"Just Say No!" (1980s–Present) This is about the crack epidemic and the War on Drugs. It also shows the popularity of rehabilitation clinics in the 1980s and 1990s, as well as the prevalence of ecstasy in the rave culture.

References
The Drug Years on VH1.com
Information on The Drug Years on the official website of Ray Manzarek

External links 
 

2006 American television series debuts
2006 American television series endings